Malaysia competed at the 1976 Summer Olympics in Montreal, Quebec, Canada. 23 competitors, all men, took part in 9 events in 5 sports.

Athletics

Men
Track & road events

Cycling

One cyclist represented Malaysia in 1976.

Road

Hockey

Men's tournament
Team roster

 Khairuddin Zainal
 Azaari Mohamed Zain
 Sri Shanmuganathan
 Francis Belavantheran
 Lam Kok Meng
 Mohinder Singh Amar
 Wong Choon Hin
 Singaram Balasingam
 Nallasamy Padanisamy
 Rengasamy Ramakrishnan
 Murugesan Mahendran
 Avtar Singh Gill
 Anthony Cruz
 Poon Fook Loke
 Ramalingam Pathmarajah
 Ow Soon Kooi

Group A

Fifth to eighth classification

Seventh and eighth place match

Ranked 8th in final standings

Shooting

Mixed

Swimming

Men

References

External links
 Official Olympic Reports

Nations at the 1976 Summer Olympics
1976